The 2019–20 F3 Asian Championship was a multi-event, Formula 3 open-wheel single seater motor racing championship held across Asia. The championship featured a mix of professional and amateur drivers, competing in Formula 3 cars that conform to the FIA Formula 3 regulations for the championship. This was the third season of the championship, which was won by Joey Alders with BlackArts Racing Team.

The season commenced on 13 December 2019 at Sepang International Circuit and finished on 23 February 2020 on Chang International Circuit, after fifteen races held at five meetings.

Teams and drivers

Race calendar
The calendar was announced on 21 August 2019. For the first time it was held during winter months. Suzuka Circuit and the two weekends at Shanghai International Circuit were dropped from the series. An additional meeting at Sepang International Circuit and weekends at the Dubai Autodrome and Yas Marina Circuit were added, keeping the schedule at five weekends.

The winter schedule allowed drivers to use the series towards earning an FIA Super Licence after a June 2019 FIA World Motor Sport Council rule change allowing drivers to collect licence points from two championships in a calendar year providing the first ends before the second starts.

Championship standings

Scoring system
Points were awarded to the top ten drivers.

Drivers' Championship

Notes:
† — Drivers did not finish the race, but were classified as they completed over 75% of the race distance.

Masters Cup

Teams Championship

Footnotes

References

External links
 

Asian F3
Asian F3
Asian F3
F3 Asian Championship